Gregor Mühlberger (born 4 April 1994) is an Austrian cyclist, who currently rides for the UCI WorldTeam .

Career
He was named in the start list for the 2016 Vuelta a España and the start list for the 2017 Giro d'Italia. In July 2018, he was named in the start list for the 2018 Tour de France.

He finished 70th representing Austria at the 2020 Summer Olympics in the Men's individual road race

Major results

2012
 2nd Road race, National Junior Road Championships
2013
 6th Overall Tour of Al Zubarah
2014
 National Road Championships
1st  Under-23 road race
1st  Under-23 time trial
2nd Time trial
2nd Road race
 1st  Overall Carpathian Couriers Race
1st  Young rider classification
1st Stage 3 (ITT)
 1st Trofeo Banca Popolare di Vicenza
 Internationaler Radsporttage Purgstall
1st Stages 1, 2 & 3
 2nd Overall Oberösterreich Rundfahrt
1st Stage 3
 4th Overall Istrian Spring Trophy
1st Prologue
 6th Raiffeisen Grand Prix
 8th Tour Bohemia
 9th La Côte Picarde
2015
 1st  Overall Oberösterreich Rundfahrt
1st  Points classification
1st  Austrian rider classification
1st Stage 4
 1st  Overall Course de la Paix Under-23
1st  Points classification
1st Stage 2
 1st GP Izola
 1st Raiffeisen Grand Prix
 2nd Giro del Belvedere
2016
 2nd Road race, National Road Championships
 2nd Rudi Altig Race
2017
 1st  Road race, National Road Championships
 1st Rund um Köln
 4th Overall Tour of Slovenia
2018
 2nd Trofeo Lloseta–Andratx
 5th Trofeo Serra de Tramuntana
 8th Overall BinckBank Tour
1st Stage 6
 10th Strade Bianche
2019
 3rd Road race, National Road Championships
2020
 1st  Overall Sibiu Cycling Tour
1st  Points classification
1st  Mountains classification
1st Stages 1 & 3a (ITT)
 2nd Pollença–Andratx
 3rd Trofeo Serra de Tramuntana
2021
 6th Road race, National Road Championships

Grand Tour general classification results timeline

References

External links

 
 
 
 
 
 
 

1994 births
Living people
Austrian male cyclists
People from Amstetten District
Sportspeople from Lower Austria
Olympic cyclists of Austria
Cyclists at the 2020 Summer Olympics